Isaac Otieno Oyieko (born 8 April 1979) is a Kenyan cricket umpire. He has stood in Twenty20 International (T20I) matches since 2007.

See also
 List of Twenty20 International cricket umpires

References

1979 births
Living people
Kenyan Twenty20 International cricket umpires
Cricketers from Nairobi